Pachil (also Romanized as Pāchīl) is a village in Golashkerd Rural District, in the Central District of Faryab County, Kerman Province, Iran. At the 2006 census, its population was 20, in 4 families.

References 

Populated places in Faryab County